Round Hill is an unincorporated community in Madison County, Kentucky, United States.  It lies 10 miles southwest of Richmond on Kentucky Route 595. Round Hill is part of the Richmond–Berea Micropolitan Statistical Area.

A burial mound attributed by the National Register of Historic Places to the Adena culture is the central feature of the village. The ovoid earthwork has a base of roughly 150 by 90 feet and a height of 25 feet. Unsystematic excavations in the early twentieth century by local residents produced flint tools and human remains. The mound stands on private property but is visible from the road.

References

Adena culture
National Register of Historic Places in Madison County, Kentucky
Unincorporated communities in Kentucky
Richmond–Berea micropolitan area
Unincorporated communities in Madison County, Kentucky
Archaeological sites on the National Register of Historic Places in Kentucky
Mounds in Kentucky